The Marrakech International Film Festival (FIFM) (Amazigh ⴰⵏⵎⵓⴳⴳⴰⵔ ⴰⴳⵔⴰⵖⵍⴰⵏ ⵏ ⵍⴼⵉⵍⵎ ⴳ ⵎⵕⵕⴰⴽⵛ ) is an international film festival founded by the Marrakech International Film Festival Foundation in 2001 and held annually in Marrakech, Morocco. The 19th edition is being held November 11–19, 2022. It is the festival's first in-person gathering following its cancellation in 2020 and 2021 due to the pandemic.

Overview
Since its inaugural year, the FIFM has been one of the biggest events devoted to Moroccan cinema. It is also the site of the principal photography of many international productions.

The festival's jury gathers important international writers, actors and personalities, and aims to reward the best Moroccan and foreign feature and short films.

The International Film Festival of Marrakech is chaired by Prince Moulay Rachid of Morocco.

Awards

Jury
In 2013, the Jury of the 13th edition of the Marrakech International Film Festival included president of the jury Martin Scorsese and jury members Fatih Akin, Patricia Clarkson, Marion Cotillard, Amat Escalante, Golshifteh Farahani, Anurag Kashyap, Narjiss Nejjar, Park Chan-wook and Paolo Sorrentino, chose award winners amongst the 15 international feature films in competition.

In 2022, the Jury of the 19th edition included Italian director Paolo Sorrentino serving as president, Danish writer/director Susanne Bier, American actor and producer Oscar Isaac, British actor Vanessa Kirby, German actor Diane Kruger, Australian director Justin Kurzel, Lebanese director and actor Nadine Labaki, Moroccan director Laïla Marrakchi and French-Algerian actor Tahar Rahim.

See also
 Film festivals in Africa

References

External links
 Official website
 10e FESTIVAL INTERNATIONAL DU FILM DE MARRAKECH3 - 11 Décembre 2010

Marrakech
Film festival
Film festivals established in 2001